Gösta Antenor Salén (January 4, 1922 – February, 2002) was a Swedish sailor who competed in the 1948 Summer Olympics.

In 1948 he won the bronze medal as a crew member of the Swedish boat Ali Baba II in the 6 metre class.

References 
 

1922 births
2002 deaths
Swedish male sailors (sport)
Olympic sailors of Sweden
Sailors at the 1948 Summer Olympics – 6 Metre
Olympic bronze medalists for Sweden
Olympic medalists in sailing

Medalists at the 1948 Summer Olympics